The Mountain Path is an English-language quarterly magazine published by Sri Ramanasramam, the ashram founded by the devotees of Sri Ramana Maharshi. It was founded by Arthur Osborne.

Published since 1964, it carries articles and translations by scholars and writers on various spiritual and cultural themes.

References

English-language magazines published in India
Magazines established in 1964
1964 establishments in Madras State
Quarterly magazines published in India
Hindu magazines
Magazines about spirituality
Mass media in Tamil Nadu